Fire Station No. 19 may refer to:
 Fire Station No. 19 (Birmingham, Alabama), listed on the NRHP in Alabama
 Fire Station 19 (Atlanta, Georgia)
 Fire Station No. 19 (Minneapolis, Minnesota), listed on the NRHP in Minnesota

See also
List of fire stations